Core is a free-to-play online video game with an integrated game creation system, developed by Manticore Games. It was released as an open alpha version on March 16, 2020, and became available as Early Access on April 15, 2021. Core hosts user-generated games that are designed for an older teen and adult audience. Core'''s game creation system is designed to simplify video game creation in order to allow more individuals to develop games. Manticore Games, the developer of Core, was co-founded by Frederic Descamps and Jordan Maynard in 2016 and is based in San Mateo, California. Core is based on a similar concept as other gaming platforms for user-generated games such as Roblox.

Game creation systemCore's  system allows for the development of up to 32-player multiplayer games and single-player games. It is not possible to import game assets into Core's game creation system; however, it is possible to modify and combine built-in game assets. Core allows users to code using the Lua programming language using an extensive built-in API. Games made with Core can not be exported into standalone games; however, they can be shared and played in Core.

Events
On December 11, 2019, Core entered a closed alpha phase, where all users were required to sign a non-disclosure agreement. On March 16, 2020, Core entered a public, open alpha phase. In September 2020, Core partnered with Dungeons & Dragons and created a competition wherein players competed to build the best Dungeons & Dragons-themed game. The winner was a game called Forgotten Cisterns.

In December 2020, two games, Mining Magnate and Roll 'Em, were the first games on the Core platform to hit 100,000 plays. On December 17, 2020, Core started the three-week "Holiday Jam" game jam, with the theme of "Winter Wonderland" and $20,000 in prizes.

Fundraising
In September 2019, Manticore Games announced that they had raised $30 million to fund Core through Series B funding. In September 2020, it was announced that Manticore Games had raised a further $15 million, of which the largest contributor was the video game company Epic Games. The interest of Epic Games in funding Manticore was tied by Dean Takahashi of VentureBeat into a desire to create a “metaverse”, wherein several different gaming platforms are interconnected. In March 2021, Manticore Games announced that they had closed a $100 million Series C funding round and described Core as a “creator multiverse.”

Reception
Core has received mixed reviews from critics. Tyler Wilde writing for PC Gamer gave a mixed review of Core, describing its game creation system as "fun", but finding that the character models were "ugly", and that they had stiff animations, as well as that the in-game weaponry and interfaces were not fun to use. Graham Smith of Rock Paper Shotgun wrote that the platform "can't help but create shabby recreations of triple-A games". Jason Fanelli from MMORPG.com'' “My mind was absolutely blown. Something that takes massive studios multiple years and millions of dollars was accomplished in front of my eyes in the same amount of time it took me to write this sentence.” In Collider, Marco Vito Oddo writes “If the project grabs enough attention, and if developers/operators Manticore can give all the support a project this big demands, Core can easily become to games what YouTube is for video content.”  About the monetization model of the platform, Scott Baird writes in ScreenRant “One of the most exciting things about Core is its revenue split, which offers 50% to its creators, allowing users to make a profit from their in-game titles.”

References

External links

 Official website

 Upcoming video games
 Early access video games
 Internet properties established in 2019
 Video games developed in the United States
 Windows games
 Unreal Engine games
 Free-to-play video games
 Massively multiplayer online games
 Active massively multiplayer online games
 Multiplayer and single-player video games
 Virtual world communities
 Video game development software
 Video games with user-generated gameplay content